Sumption may refer to:

 Anthony Sumption (1919–2008), British submarine commander and tax lawyer
 Charles Sumption (1910–1988), Indian cricketer
 Harold Sumption (1916–1998), English advertising executive and fundraiser
 Jonathan Sumption, Lord Sumption (born 1948), British historian and judge
 Madeleine Sumption, director of the Migration Observatory at the University of Oxford